This List of hospitals in Chernihiv

Hospitals in Chernihiv
407th Military Hospital
Chernihiv medical center of modern oncology
Chernihiv Regional Clinical Hospital
Chernihiv Central District Hospital
Psychiatric Hospital ('Чернігівська обласна психоневрологічна лікарня')

References

hospitals
Chernihiv-related lists
Hospitals in Ukraine